Spatalla confusa the long-tube spoon is a flowering shrub native to the Western Cape where it forms part of the fynbos. It is found in the Cederberg up to the Hottentots Holland Mountains, Swartberg and Kammanassie Mountains

References

Further reading
 https://www.proteaatlas.org.za/PROTEA_ATLAS_main_part2.pdf

confusa
Fynbos